Joel Maurice Hefley (born April 18, 1935) is an American Republican politician who served as a member of the United States House of Representatives representing the 5th Congressional District of Colorado from 1987 to 2007. His wife, Lynn Hefley, is, like him, a former member of the Colorado State House of Representatives. They have three daughters.

He was born in Ardmore, the seat of Carter County in southeastern Oklahoma, earned his B.A. at Oklahoma Baptist University in Shawnee, and his M.A. at Oklahoma State University in Stillwater. He worked as a management consultant and then as executive director of the Colorado Community Planning and Research Council, a nonprofit organization. He was a member of the Colorado House of Representatives for one term in 1977–78. Hefley was subsequently elected to  the Colorado Senate before entering the U.S. House of Representatives.

He served as chairman of the House Ethics Committee until 2005. His tenure propelled him from being "among the most obscure members" in the House to gaining national attention, when the Committee formally admonished House Majority Leader Tom DeLay three times; Hefley also handled the expulsion case of James Traficant, and oversaw the investigation of Alan Mollohan. Because Hefley had served 3 terms as chairman, he was term limited from serving as chairman in the 109th Congress.

When the new Congress opened in January 2005, House Republicans pushed through new rules curtailing the ways ethics investigations can be launched. While Hefley voted for the rules, he criticized the procedure, "saying he thought the changes were a mistake since they were done without bipartisan discussion." Within a month, Rep. Doc Hastings was chosen as Hefley's replacement due to Hefley's chairmanship expiring.

On February 16, 2006, Hefley ended speculation as to whether he would seek re-election in 2006, instead retiring after 10 terms in Congress, despite pledging in 1986 that he would not serve longer than three terms (6 years.)

Gay rights
In 1998, Hefley introduced an amendment blocking federal funding for Executive Order 13087, an executive order issued by President Bill Clinton to prohibit discrimination against gay and lesbian employees in the federal government.

2006 Congressional race 

In the August GOP primary to succeed him, Hefley backed his long-time aide, former administrative director Jeff Crank, who lost in a contentious six-way race to State Senator Doug Lamborn. Hefley was incensed at the tactics used in the election, particularly a mailed brochure from the Christian Coalition of Colorado associating Crank with "public support for members and efforts of the homosexual agenda." Hefley said that he "suspected, but couldn't prove, collusion between Lamborn's campaign, which is managed by Jon Hotaling, and the Christian Coalition of Colorado, which is run by Hotaling's brother, Mark." Hefley called it "one of the sleaziest, most dishonest campaigns I've seen in a long time," and, as a result, refused to endorse Lamborn.

References

External links
 
 OnTheIssues
 Voting record maintained by the Washington Post
 

1935 births
Living people
People from Ardmore, Oklahoma
American Presbyterians
Oklahoma Baptist University alumni
Oklahoma State University alumni
Republican Party members of the Colorado House of Representatives
Republican Party Colorado state senators
Republican Party members of the United States House of Representatives from Colorado
21st-century American politicians
Politicians from Colorado Springs, Colorado
Spouses of Colorado politicians